

Documentaries

Animation

Other

References

External links 
IMDB listing for German films made in 1927
filmportal.de listing for films made in 1927

German
Lists of German films
film